Dino Latino is an album by Dean Martin. Recorded during August 1962, the album is a collection of Latin standards and popular songs composed in the same vein.

Description
While the A-side of the record features five uptempo songs (among them are "Mañana" (popularized by Peggy Lee) and "South of the Border", which he later re-recorded for the soundtrack of The Silencers), B-Side consists of five ballads. All songs on the album were arranged and conducted by Don Costa, except for the closing track, "La Paloma", which is credited to Chuck Sagle.

Releases
Originally released on Frank Sinatra's Reprise label as LP R(S)-6054 ('S' distinguishing the stereo pressing), the album's tracks made their CD debut as part of the Bear Family box set Everybody Loves Somebody (BCD 16343). A subsequent two-on-one CD (together with Dean Martin's preceding album French Style) by Collectors' Choice restored the original running order.

In early 2014, Martin's entire 1962-1974 Reprise catalogue was acquired by Legacy Recordings, a division of Sony Music. Legacy stated they intended to perform album reissues, Dino Latino among them. The deal also included Martin's final album The Nashville Sessions, recorded 1983 for Warners Music.

Track listing 
Side 1
"(Alla En) El Rancho Grande" – (Silvano R. Ramos, Bartley Costello) - 2:18
"Mañana (Is Soon Enough for Me)" – (Peggy Lee, Dave Barbour) - 2:33
"Tangerine" – (Victor Schertzinger, Johnny Mercer) - 2:06
"South of the Border" – (Jimmy Kennedy, Michael Carr) - 1:52
"In a Little Spanish Town" – (Mabel Wayne, Sam M. Lewis, Joe Young) - 2:33
Side 2
"What a Diff'rence a Day Made" – (Maria Grever, Stanley Adams) - 2:46
"Magic Is the Moonlight" – (Grever, Charles Pasquale) - 2:38
"Always in My Heart" – (Ernesto Lecuona, Kim Gannon) - 2:46
"Bésame Mucho" – (Consuelo Velasquez, Sunny Skylar) - 2:27
"La Paloma" – (Sebastián Iradier) - 3:04
Side 1 recorded August 28, 1962; Side 2, tracks 1–4 recorded August 29, track 5 recorded August 30

References

1962 albums
Dean Martin albums
Reprise Records albums
Albums arranged by Don Costa
Albums conducted by Don Costa
Collectors' Choice Music albums